"Getting into Something" is a song by British singer-songwriter Alison Moyet, released in May 1994 as the third single from her fourth studio album Essex. It was written by Moyet and Pete Glenister and produced by Ian Broudie.

Background
Columbia had rejected the original recording of Essex and insisted that it be re-recorded to create a more commercial package. The label hired Ian Broudie to produce various tracks for the re-recorded version; one of which was "Getting into Something". The song was selected as the album's third single. For its release as a single, "Getting into Something" was remixed. The mixing was handled by Dave Bascombe. A "Midnight Mix" of the song was also created by Bay Route.

"Getting into Something" reached number 51 in the UK and remained on the chart for two weeks. It was released on 12-inch, cassette and CD in the UK and on CD across Europe. A promotional video was filmed for the single, which was directed by Liam & Grant (Liam Kan and Grant Hodgson) for the production company HLA. During July 1994, the video was listed in Billboard magazine's The Clip List - a sampling of playlists submitted by national and local music video outlets. The video had received play on the local Boston TV music programme Rage as well as on the Chicago JBTV WWOR network.

Critical reception
Upon its release as a single, Alan Jones of Music Week wrote, "Saddled with an ordinary song, for which, as co-writer, Moyet must share the blame, it is nonetheless always pleasant to hear her voice. Something a little more challenging would have been preferable, however." Pan-European magazine Music & Media were more favourable, describing it as a "ballad with a demanding dance rhythm" and praising Moyet's vocal performance on the track.

In a review of Essex, Hi-Fi News & Record Review commented, "Tracks like 'Whispering Your Name' and 'Getting into Something' are cleverly arranged, slickly produced, efficiently played and make good showcases for the Moyet lung-power but, they lack memorable tunes." In a retrospective review of the album, Helena Adams of the music website Reflections of Darkness commented on the song's "amazing funky entrance that sets up the ambience with [Moyet's] sensuous voice". Attitude writer Josh Lee described the song as a "forgotten gem".

Track listings
12-inch single
 "Getting into Something" – 4:15
 "Getting into Something" (Midnight mix) – 4:31
 "Never Too Late" (remix) – 3:49

CD single
 "Getting into Something" – 4:15
 "Dorothy" (acoustic) – 3:11
 "Ne me quitte pas" (acoustic) – 3:42
 "Never Too Late" – 3:50

Cassette single
 "Getting into Something" – 4:15
 "Dorothy" (acoustic) – 3:11

Personnel
 Alison Moyet – vocals
 Ian Broudie – guitar, producer, sound mixing
 Simon Fowler – backing vocals
 Steve Cradock – backing vocals
 Dave Bascombe – mixing
 Simon Rogers – programming
 Cenzo Townshend – sound engineer
 Bay Route – remixer on Midnight mix
 Victor Van Vugt – producer on "Dorothy" and "Ne me quitte pas"
 Pete Glenister – producer on "Never Too Late"
 Adrian Bushby, Pete Davis – remixers, additional producers on "Never Too Late"
 Alison Moyet, Martin Jenkins – artwork design
 The Douglas Brothers – photography

Charts

References

1994 singles
1994 songs
Alison Moyet songs
Columbia Records singles
Song recordings produced by Ian Broudie
Music videos directed by Liam Kan
Songs written by Alison Moyet
Songs written by Pete Glenister